Meghasri is an Indian actress who predominantly works in Kannada and Telugu films. She is also known for playing the lead role in the popular supernatural television series Nagakannike and Jothi.

Career 
Meghasri made her film debut with the Telugu film Panchamukhi (2015) before starring in the Telugu film Anaganaga Oka Chitram that same year.  She made her Tamil debut with Ka Ka Ka: Aabathin Arikuri (2017). That same year, she made her Kannada debut with the film March 22  and starred in a supporting role in Oxygen. Meghasri played an important role in Jr NTR's biggest hit Aravinda Sametha Veera Raghava (2018). She then appeared in several Kannada films including Krishna Tulasi (2018), Kaddu Mucchi (2019) and Dasharatha (2019). In a review of Krishna Tulasi by the Deccan Chronicle, the reviewer wrote that "it is Meghashree who makes a mark with this one". Later she played the lead roles in the Kannada television serials Naga Kannike and Ivalu Sujatha. Meghasri worked on the Tamil film Konala Irunthalum Ennodadhu, which is yet to be released. She earned a lot of appreciation with her participation as Wildcard Entry in Bigg Boss Kannada season 6 in 2019. In 2021, Meghasri played the title role in a supernatural television series Jothi which was a sequel to Nandini. Meghasri has also worked in Bhojpuri with the movies Right and Aparadhi. Rajamarthanda, Ward Number 11, Manasaagide in Kannada and A Padam in Tamil are her upcoming films.

Filmography

Television

References

External links 

Living people
Actresses in Kannada cinema
Actresses in Tamil cinema
Actresses in Telugu cinema
Indian film actresses
21st-century Indian actresses
1997 births